The &apos;Nam Dok Mai&apos; mango (also spelled Nam Doc Mai) is a mango cultivar which originated in Thailand. It is the most popular mango variety in Thailand, and is grown commercially in Australia and Colombia as well, albeit as a minor variety.

The Nam Dok Mai tree is medium-sized, potentially reaching heights of over six meters. It is an early-midseason variety, with the potential for multiple crops in a year. The fruit is elongated, with a prominent beak, and is normally yellow with green spots. It is a polyembryonic-seeded variety. The flesh of the fruit is known for having very little fibre, strong and pleasant aroma, and very sweet taste.

Nam Dok Mai trees are planted in the USDA germplasm repository in Miami, Florida, as well as the University of Florida's Tropical Research and Education Center.

See also 
 List of mango cultivars

References

Citations

General references

 

Mango cultivars
Cultivars originating in Thailand